is a Japanese voice actress and singer best known as the voice of Miki Hoshii in The Idolmaster series. She also voices Akari in Fantasista Doll and Rena Asihara in Ro-Kyu-Bu!. On February 25, 2014, she announced that she has been married on her blog.

Filmography

Anime

Film

Video games

Discography

Albums

Character albums and singles

Singles

References

External links
  at Arts Vision 
 Akiko Hasegawa profile at Oricon 

Japanese voice actresses
Voice actresses from Niigata Prefecture
Living people
Year of birth missing (living people)
21st-century Japanese actresses
21st-century Japanese women singers
21st-century Japanese singers
Arts Vision voice actors